Robert L. Sumner  (August 3, 1922 – December 5, 2016) was an American Christian author, Baptist pastor, evangelist and editor of the fundamentalist newspaper called The Biblical Evangelist.

Personal

Born to an educated family in Upstate New York he graduated from Norwich High School and  Summit University (formerly Baptist Bible College & Seminary in Johnson City, New York).  He also received honorary graduate degrees from Bob Jones University and Louisiana Baptist Theological Seminary in Sacred Theology. He was the brother-in-law of auto racing legend Hector Honore. Sumner died in December 2016 at the age of 94.

Ministry

He was pastor of a number of Baptist churches in Illinois, California, Texas and Ohio. In 1959, he created the non-profit Sumner Evangelistic Foundation. In 1965, he was on the Council of 14 (now Council of 18) of the General Association of Regular Baptist Churches, and he changed the name of his foundation to Regular Baptist Evangelism. In May, 1966, this group launched a newsletter called  The Regular Baptist Evangelist, which 9 months later became just The Biblical Evangelist. He has also attended many Christian conferences and lectures.

In 1982, Sumner left The Sword after a dispute with the editor that was mediated by Jack Hyles.  After the ordeal, Sumner complained that he was left "without an editorial voice", so he restarted The Biblical Evangelist by sending letters to former subscribers asking them to resubscribe.  Sumner continued as editor of the Biblical Evangelist until 2016, publishing the last edition only two months before he died.

Hyles exposé

Sumner received some attention for criticizing Jack Hyles in 1989 when he wrote a story in  The Biblical Evangelist called, "The Saddest Story I've Ever Told," which accused Hyles of sexual scandals, financial misappropriation and doctrinal errors. These charges were denied by Hyles who deemed them "lies". Hyles' daughter, Linda [Hyles] Murphrey, confirmed in 2012 the truth of charges against her father, and that she considered her father the leader of a "cult." She speaks of this in a TEDx Talk.

Author

Sumner published a total of 43 books including his last, Favorite Editorials, a collection of his favorite editorials from over the years, 304-pages (2015). He is also the official biographer of John R. Rice. The Biblical Evangelist is no longer published, and except for The Saddest Story is no longer available online.

Bibliography
Favorite Editorials, Robert L. Sumner, Editor—Biblical Evangelism Press (2015) 297 pgs. 
The Honor Was All Mine—Biblical Evangelism Press (2015) 304 pgs. 
The Wonder of the Word of God!  Revised Edition—Biblical Evangelism Press (2013) 40 pgs.
Fights I Didn’t Start ... and some I did, Round 2—Biblical Evangelism Press (2011) 262 pgs. 
Fights I Didn't Start ... and some I did—Biblical Evangelism Press (2009) 
Jewels from James—Biblical Evangelism Press (2008) 317 pgs. 
HEBREWS: Streams of Living Water—Biblical Evangelism Press (2003) 546 pgs. 
"Jesus Christ is God!: an Examination of Victor Paul Wierwille and His "the Way International, " a Rapidly Growing Unitarian Cult—Biblical Evangelism Press (1983)  
Mormonism—Sword of the Lord Pub. (1981) 47 pgs.  
Falsities of Seventh-Day Adventism—Sword of the Lord Pub. (1981) 
After the revival—What?: Searching Sermons for the Saints—Biblical Evangelism Press (1980) 114 pgs.  
Saved by Grace...for Service!: Evangelistic preaching in Ephesians—Sword of the Lord Pub. (1979) 333 pgs.  
Bible translations: Is the King James Version the only trustworthy translation? What text is inerrant, infallible, God-breathed? Can we trust any translation? ... is the historic fundamentalist position?—Biblical Evangelism Press (1979) 30 pgs. 
Powerhouse!—Biblical Evaneglism Press (1978) 203 pgs.  
Armstrongism: the "Worldwide Church of God" Examined in the Searching Light of Scripture—Biblical Evangelism Press (1974) 424 pgs. 
An Examination of Tulip: The Five Points of Calvinism—Biblical Evangelism Press (1972) 23 pgs.  
The Christian who refused to go to church—Biblical Evangelism Press (1971) 31 pgs. 
The Menace of Narcotics—Biblical Evangelism Press (1971) 72 pgs.  
Sumner's Incidents and Illustrations—Biblical Evangelism Press (1969) 480 pgs.
The Wonder of the Word of God!—Biblical Evangelism Press (1969) 35 pgs.
Biblical Evangelism in Action—Sword of the Lord Pub (January 1, 1966) 344 pgs.  
Balaam: the World's First Ecumenical Evangelist—Sword of the Lord Pub. (1964) 24 pgs.  
Herbert Armstrong, A False Prophet—Sword of the Lord Pub. (1961) 23 pgs.
Sin's Surprises!—Sumner Evangelistic Foundation (1961) 23 pgs.
Evangelism: The Church on Fire—Sword of the Lord Pub. (1960) 220 pgs. 
Man Sent from God: A Biography of Dr. John R. Rice—Sword of the Lord Pub. (1959) 264 pgs.  
Hell is No Joke—Sword of the Lord Pub. (1959) 121 pgs.
The Worst Thing That Can Happen to You -- (1959) 
A Review and Expose of the Interpreter's Bible—Sword of the Lord Pub. (1957) 47 PGS. 
Hollywood Cesspool: A Startling Survey of Movieland Lives and Morals, Pictures and Results—Sword of the Lord Pub. (1955)  
The Blight of Booze—Sword of the Lord Pub. (1955) 24 pgs.  
Separation from Sin and Worldliness—Sword of the Lord Pub. (1955) 30 pgs.

References

External links
The Biblical Evangelist–  Sumner's official page
The Biblical Evangelist: Jack Hyles Story

1922 births
2016 deaths
American evangelists
American non-fiction writers
American religious writers
Baptist Bible College & Seminary alumni
Baptist ministers from the United States
Christian fundamentalism
People from Norwich, New York
Baptists from New York (state)